Antoine Gaston de Roquelaure (1656-6 May 1738) was a French nobleman and Marshal of France. He was also grandson to another Marshal, Antoine de Roquelaure.

He was the son of Gaston Jean Baptiste de Roquelaure (1615-1683), Duke of Roquelaure and his wife Charlotte du Lude (died 1657).

On 19 May 1683 he married Marie-Louise de Laval-Lezay, daughter of Guy-Urbain de Laval-Montmorency (1657-1735), with whom he had two daughters :

 Françoise (1683-1740) who married (1708), Louis Bretagne de Rohan (1679-1738), Prince of Léon then Duke of Rohan ;
  Élisabeth (1696-1752) who married (1714), Charles Louis of Lorraine, "Count of Marsan" (1696-1755),  Prince of Mortagne and Lord of Pons.

According to Saint-Simon, he was "pleasant company"

Bibliography
Michel Popoff et préface d'Hervé Pinoteau, Armorial de l'Ordre du Saint-Esprit : d'après l'œuvre du père Anselme et ses continuateurs, Paris, Le Léopard d'or, 1996, 204 p.

1656 births
1738 deaths
Marshals of France